The Massachusetts Society for Promoting Agriculture (M.S.P.A.) is one of the earliest agricultural societies in the United States. The Society was incorporated by an act of the Commonwealth of Massachusetts  on March 7, 1792. The Society's founding members included Samuel Adams, Charles Bulfinch, Timothy Pickering, Benjamin Lincoln, Christopher Gore, and Benjamin Guild.

History
The Massachusetts Society for Promoting Agriculture was established to promote the study and experimentation of agricultural endeavors. The M.S.P.A. historically has given handsome premiums to individuals who made useful discoveries in the field and communicated these improvements to the general public.

Premiums
The first premiums (prizes) offered by the MSPA were $50 for "the most satisfactory account of the natural history of the canker-worm" and $100 for the cheapest and most effective method of eradicating it. Premiums were also offered for the cultivation of wheat and other grains; the improvement of land, including the reclamation of salt marshes; the raising of trees; the greatest stock maintained on the least land; the best vegetable food for wintering stock; the most and best wool from a given number of sheep; the best process for making cider, maple sugar, butter, cheese, flax, and salted provisions; and for the best farm journals, manures, tree plantations, advances in ploughs and ploughing techniques, and farms in general.

Events

Publications
In 1813, the M.S.P.A. began publishing semi-annually the Massachusetts Agricultural Journal, which was discontinued in 1827 when the publication of various weekly farming journals supplanted the need for a semi-annual one.

References

Further reading
Constitution of the Massachusetts Society for Promoting Agriculture, Massachusetts Society for Promoting Agriculture. Boston: Nathan Sawyer & Son, Printers, 1894. 2013-10-22.
Centennial Year (1792-1892) of the Massachusetts Society for Promoting Agriculture, Massachusetts Society for Promoting Agriculture. Salem: Printed at Salem Observer Office, 1892. 2013-10-22. 

1792 establishments in Massachusetts
Organizations based in Massachusetts
Clubs and societies in the United States
Agricultural organizations based in the United States
Agriculture in Massachusetts